The Mark Twain Readers Award is given annually to a book for children in grades four through six.

Winner 
Mrs. Frisby and the Rats of Nimh by Robert C. O'Brien

Nominations 
The King's Fountain by Lloyd Alexander
Goody Hall' by Natalie BabbittFeldman Fieldmouse by Nathaniel BenchleyJoseph, The Dreamer by Clyde Robert BullaA Room Made of Windows by Eleanor CameronThe Spider, The Cave and the Pottery Bowl by Eleanor ClymerJingo Django by Sid FleischmanAll Upon a Stone by Jean Craighead GeorgeThe Planet of Junior Brown by Virginia HamiltonThe Trees Stand Shining by Hettie JonesThe Tombs of Atuan by Ursula K. Le GuinKate by Jean LittleAnnie and the Old One by Miska MilesThe Vicksburg Veteran by F. N. MonjoDeep Trouble by Walt MoreyThe Almost Year by Florence RandallThe Bear's House by Marilyn SachsThe Headless Cupid by Zilpha SnyderBy the Highway Home by Mary StolzChipmunks on the Doorstep'' by Edwin Tunis

References

Mark Twain Awards